The 2009-10 Belize Premier Football League is the highest competitive football league in Belize, which was founded in 1991. There are two seasons spread over two years, the opening and the closing.

Closing season

The closing season started on 13 February 2010 and concluded on 30 May 2010.

Regular stage

The San Pedro Sea Dogs and Georgetown Ibayani game scheduled for 17 March 2010 was not played, therefore that is why only both teams played 13 games.

Playoff stage
Quarter-finals

Teams ranked 3-6 played a one off game to gain a place in the Semi-finals, in order to play the top 2 ranked teams from the regular stage.

Paradise Freedom Fighters lost to Georgetown Ibayani
There is no score available for this game
FC Belize 1-1 San Pedro Sea Dogs
FC Belize win 4-3 on penalties

Semi-finals

Georgetown Ibayani and FC Belize advanced from the Quarter-finals to play the top 2 ranked teams from the regular stage, Belize Defence Force and Hankook Verdes United.

First Legs:
Georgetown Ibayani 2-1 Hankook Verdes United
FC Belize 0-1 Belize Defence Force

Second Legs:
Hankook Verdes United 2-2 Georgetown Ibayani
Georgetown Ibayani win 4-3 on aggregate
Belize Defence Force 3-0 FC Belize - FC Belize walked off at 0-0 and therefore lost 3-0
Belize Defence Force win 4-0 on aggregate

Final

The winners of the Caribbean Motors Cup 2010 Spring Season was determined by a 2 legged match between Georgetown Ibayani and Belize Defence Force.

First Leg:
Georgetown Ibayani 1-2 Belize Defence Force

Second Leg:
Belize Defence Force 2-0 Georgetown Ibayani
Belize Defence Force win 4-1 on aggregate and subsequently win the league

All stats from the Caribbean Motors Cup 2010 (Closing Season) were found here.

References

Top level Belizean football league seasons
1
Bel